Portugal competed at the 1980 Summer Olympics in Moscow, USSR.

Portugal sent a delegation of eleven competitors. These participated in six sports, with a debut in boxing, however no medals were won.

Results by event

Athletics
Men's 1,500 metres
 João José Pontes Campos
 Round 1 (heat 2) — 3:41.3 (→ 5th)
 Semi-final (heat 1) — 3:44.4 (→ 7th, did not advance)

Men's 3,000 metres Steeplechase
 José Manuel Sena
 Round 1 (heat 3) — did not finish

Men's Marathon
 Anacleto Pereira Pinto
 Final — 2:17:04 (→ 16th place)

Boxing
Men's Light Flyweight (–48 kg):
 João Manuel Miguel (a.k.a. Paquito)
 1/16 final — Bye
 1/8 final — Shamil Sabirov (URS) (→ lost 5:0, did not advance)

Gymnastics
Women's Team All-Round Competition:
 Maria Avelina Alvarez — 69,00 pts (→ 9th – 16th)
{|class=wikitable style="text-align:center; text-size:90%;"
|colspan=4|Subdivision 1
|-
!Exercises!!C!!O!!Total
|-
!Vault
|8,85||8,65||17,50
|-
!Uneven Bars
|8,85||8,05||16,90
|-
!Balance Beam
|8,90||8,90||17,80
|-
!Floor
|8,75||8,05||16,80
|-
!bgcolor=#ffffff|Total
|35,35||33,65||69,00
|- 
|align=left colspan=4|Notes: C – compulsory; O – optional
|}

Judo
Men's –60 kg:
 João Paulo Mendonça
Pool B:
 Round 1 — Marian Donat (POL) (→ won by waza-ari)
 Round 2 — Thierry Rey (FRA) (→ lost by ippon)
 Repêchage — Reino Fagerlund (FIN) (→ lost by koka, did not advance)

Men's Half Lightweight (–65 kg):
 José António Branco
Pool A:
 Round 1 — Abdoulaye Thera (MLI) (→ won by waza-ari awasete ippon)
 Round 2 — Ilian Nedkov (BUL) (→ lost by waza-ari awasete ippon, did not advance)

Men's Half Middleweight (–70 kg):
 António Roquete Andrade
Pool A:
 Round 1 — Bye
 Round 2 — Berkane Lakhdar Adda (ALG) (→ won by waza-ari)
 Round 3 — Bernard Tchoullouyan (FRA) (→ lost by ippon, did not advance)

Swimming
Men's 100m Backstroke:
 Rui Pinto Abreu
 Heats (heat 2) — 1:00.62(→ 5th, did not advance)

Men's 200m Backstroke:
 Rui Pinto Abreu
 Heats (heat 1) — did not participate

Men's 100m Butterfly:
 Paulo Frischknecht
 Heats (heat 4)— 57.94 (→ 5th, did not advance)

Men's 100m Freestyle:
 Rui Pinto Abreu
 Heats (heat 1) — 52.85 (→ 5th, did not advance)

Men's 200m Freestyle:
 Rui Pinto Abreu
 Heats (heat 1) — 1:55.25 (→ 4th, did not advance)
 Paulo Frischknecht
 Heats (heat 1)— 1:55.06 (→ 3rd, did not advance)

Men's 400m Freestyle:
 Paulo Frischknecht
 Heats (heat 4)— did not participate

Weightlifting
Men's Flyweight (–52 kg):
 Raul Diniz — 197,0 pts (→ 13th)
{|class=wikitable style="text-align:center;"
!rowspan=2|Event!!colspan=3|Attempt!!rowspan=2|Result!!rowspan=2|Place
|-
!1!!2!!3
|-
!Snatch
|82,5||87,5||87,5||82,5||17th
|-
!Clean& Jerk
|115,0||120,0||122,5||115,0||11th
|-
!colspan=4|Total
|197,5||13th
|}

Officials
 Salles Grade (chief of mission)
 Fernando Lima Bello (chief of mission)

References
Organising Committee of the Games of the XXII Olympiad Moscow 1980 (1981). Official Report of the Games of the XXII Olympiad - Volume 2: The organisation (Retrieved on November 9, 2006).
Organising Committee of the Games of the XXII Olympiad Moscow 1980 (1981). Official Report of the Games of the XXII Olympiad - Volume 3: The participants and results (Retrieved on November 10, 2006).

Nations at the 1980 Summer Olympics
1980 Summer Olympics
1980 in Portuguese sport